| tries = {{#expr:

 8 + 5 + 2 + 2 + 5 + 1 + 4 + 4 + 5 + 5
 + 10 + 6 + 5 + 8 + 11 + 8 + 8 + 7 + 6 + 3
 + 3 + 3 + 6 + 4 + 8 + 10 + 7 + 9 + 5 + 8
 + 8 + 8 + 7 + 1 + 3 + 4 + 6 + 5 + 6 + 3
 + 5 + 3 + 7 + 7 + 9 + 5 + 7 + 7 + 8 + 6
 + 4 + 7 + 7 + 1 + 7 + 8 + 3 + 9 + 2 + 6 
 + 3 + 10 + 4 + 5
 + 3 + 3
 + 3
}}
| top point scorer =  Owen Farrell (Saracens)89 points 
| top try scorer =  Jacob Stockdale (Ulster) Seán Cronin (Leinster)6 tries each
| venue = St James' Park, Newcastle upon Tyne
| attendance2 = 51,930
| champions =  Saracens
| count = 3
| runner-up =  Leinster
| website = http://www.epcrugby.com
| previous year = 2017–18
| previous tournament = 2017–18 European Rugby Champions Cup
| next year = 2019–20
| next tournament = 2019–20 European Rugby Champions Cup
}}

The 2018–19 European Rugby Champions Cup (known as the Heineken Champions Cup for sponsorship reasons) is the fifth season of the European Rugby Champions Cup, the annual club rugby union competition run by European Professional Club Rugby (ECPR) for teams from the top six nations in Europe. It is the 24th season of pan-European professional club rugby competition. This competition is the first to be sponsored by Heineken since the 2013–14 season.

The tournament started on 12 October 2018. The final, featuring the last two winners of the event, Saracens and Leinster, took place on 11 May 2019 at St James' Park in Newcastle upon Tyne, England, with Saracens being crowned champions for the third time.

Teams
Twenty clubs from the three major European domestic and regional leagues competed in the Champions Cup. Nineteen of these qualified directly as a result of their league performance.

In a change to previous seasons, the play-off to decide the 20th team was not held. The final place in the Champions Cup is now directly awarded in the following order:
 Champions Cup winner, if not already qualified
 Challenge Cup winner, if not already qualified
 Challenge Cup losing finalist, if not already qualified
 Challenge Cup semi-finalist, if not already qualified, or the winner of a play-off between both semi-finalists, if both have not already qualified
 Highest ranked non-qualified club by virtue of league position from the same league as the Champions Cup winner

The distribution of teams is:
 England: 7 clubs
 The top 6 clubs in the English Premiership. (6 clubs)
 The runner-up of the 2017–18 Challenge Cup Final, Gloucester. (1 club)
 France: 6 clubs
 The top 6 clubs in the Top 14. (6 clubs)
 Ireland, Scotland & Wales: 7 clubs, based on performance in the Pro14.
Following the inclusion of 2 South African teams into the Pro14, the tournament format and qualification process was changed.
The top 3 sides in each Pro14 conference (not including the South African sides, who are not eligible for European competition), automatically qualify for the Champions Cup. The previous requirement for each country (Ireland, Italy, Scotland and Wales) to be represented was waived beginning with this season. (6 Teams)
The next best placed eligible team in each conference compete in a one-off play-off game to determine the 7th Pro14 team. (1 Team)

The following teams qualified for the 2018–19 tournament.

Team details
Below is the list of coaches, captain and stadiums with their method of qualification for each team.

Note: Placing shown in brackets, denotes standing at the end of the regular season for their respective leagues, with their end of season positioning shown through CH for Champions, RU for Runner-up, SF for losing Semi-finalist, QF for losing Quarter-finalist, and PO for the Pro14 7th place play-off winner.

Seeding
The twenty competing teams are seeded and split into four tiers, each containing five teams.

For the purpose of creating the tiers, clubs are ranked based on their domestic league performances and on their qualification for the knockout phases of their championships. For example, a losing quarter-finalist would be seeded below a losing semi-finalist, even if they finished above them in the regular season.

Based on these seedings, teams are placed into one of the four tiers, with the top seed clubs being put in Tier 1. The nature of the tier system means that a draw is needed to allocate two of the three second seed clubs to Tier 1 and to allocate one of the three fourth seed clubs to Tier 2. The tiers are shown below. Brackets show each team's seeding and their league (for example, "1 Top 14" indicates the team was seeded 1st from the Top 14).

The following restrictions will apply to the draw:
 Each pool will consist of four clubs, one from each Tier in the draw.
 Each pool must have one from each league drawn from Tier 1, 2, or 3. No pool will have a second team from the same league until the allocation of Tier 4 takes place.
 Where two Pro14 clubs compete in the same pool, they must be from different countries.

Pool stage

The draw took place on 20 June 2018, in Lausanne, Switzerland.

Teams in the same pool play each other twice, at home and away, in the group stage that begins on the weekend of 12–14 October 2018, and continues through to 18–20 January 2019. The five pool winners and three best runners-up progress to the quarter finals.

Teams are awarded group points based on match performances. Four points are awarded for a win, two points for a draw, one attacking bonus point for scoring four or more tries in a match and one defensive bonus point for losing a match by seven points or fewer.

In the event of a tie between two or more teams, the following tie-breakers are used, as directed by EPCR:
 Where teams have played each other
 The club with the greater number of competition points from only matches involving tied teams.
 If equal, the club with the best aggregate points difference from those matches.
 If equal, the club that scored the most tries in those matches.
 Where teams remain tied and/or have not played each other in the competition (i.e. are from different pools)
 The club with the best aggregate points difference from the pool stage.
 If equal, the club that scored the most tries in the pool stage.
 If equal, the club with the fewest players suspended in the pool stage.
 If equal, the drawing of lots will determine a club's ranking.

Pool 1

Pool 2

Pool 3

Pool 4

Pool 5

Ranking of pool leaders and runners-up

Knock-out stage

Format
The eight qualifiers are ranked according to their performance in the pool stage and compete in the quarter-finals which will be held on the weekend of 28–31 March 2019. The four top teams will host the quarter-finals against the four lower teams in a 1v8, 2v7, 3v6 and 4v5 format.

The semi-finals were played on the weekend of 19–21 April 2019. As in recent seasons, a fixed semi-final bracket was set in advance. Beginning this season, the higher-seeded team received home country/venue advantage for each semi-final, regardless of whether they won their quarter-final at home or on the road. Also new for this season was the EPCR's use of discretion to allow semi-finals to be played at a qualified club's home venue.

The winners of the semi-finals contested the final, at St James' Park, on 11 May 2019.

Bracket

Quarter-finals

Semi-finals

Final

Attendances

Does not include the attendance at the final as it takes place at a neutral venue.

Player scoring
 Appearance figures also include coming on as substitutes (unused substitutes not included).

Most points

Most tries

Season records

Team
Largest home win – 49 points
52–3 Leinster at home to Wasps on 12 October 2018
Largest away win – 26 points
41–15 Munster away to Gloucester on 11 January 2019
Most points scored – 56 points
56–27 Saracens at home to Glasgow Warriors on 30 March 2019
Most tries in a match – 8
Leinster at home to Wasps on 12 October 2018
Most conversions in a match – 6 (3)
Leinster at home to Wasps on 12 October 2018
Leinster at home to Bath on 15 December 2018
Saracens at home to Glasgow Warriors on 30 March 2019
Most penalties in a match – 6
Saracens at home to Munster on 20 April 2019
Most drop goals in a match – 1  
Castres at home to Exeter Chiefs on 20 October 2018
Lyon at home to Saracens on 13 January 2019

Player
Most points in a match – 26
 Joey Carbery for Munster at away to Gloucester on 11 January 2019
Most tries in a match – 2
Multiple players
Most conversions in a match – 6
 Alex Lozowski for Saracens at home to Glasgow Warriors on 30 March 2019
Most penalties in a match – 6
 Owen Farrell for Saracens at home to Munster on 20 April 2019
Most drop goals in a match – 1 (2)
 Julien Dumora for Castres at home to Exeter Chiefs on 20 October 2018
 Jonathan Wisniewski for Lyon at home to Saracens on 13 January 2019

Attendances
Highest – 51,930
Saracens versus Leinster on 11 May 2019 (Final)
Lowest – 6,383
Newcastle Falcons at home to Montpellier on 21 October 2018
Highest average attendance — 34,285
Leinster
Lowest average attendance — 6,750
Newcastle Falcons

See also
 2018–19 European Rugby Challenge Cup
 2018–19 European Rugby Continental Shield

Notes

References

 
Champions Cup
European Rugby Champions Cup
European Rugby Champions Cup
European Rugby Champions Cup
European Rugby Champions Cup
European Rugby Champions Cup
European Rugby Champions Cup
European Rugby Champions Cup seasons